Nova Vas is a settlement north of Preddvor in the Upper Carniola region of Slovenia.

References

External links
Nova Vas at Geopedia.si

Populated places in the Municipality of Preddvor